Noribogaine (actually O-desmethylibogaine), or 12-hydroxyibogamine, is the principal psychoactive metabolite of the oneirogen ibogaine. It is thought to be involved in the antiaddictive effects of ibogaine-containing plant extracts, such as Tabernanthe iboga.

Pharmacology
Noribogaine is a potent serotonin reuptake inhibitor, but does not affect the reuptake of dopamine. Unlike ibogaine, noribogaine does not bind to the sigma-2 receptor. Similarly to ibogaine, noribogaine acts as a weak NMDA receptor antagonist and binds to opioid receptors. It has greater affinity for each of the opioid receptors than does ibogaine.

Noribogaine is a hERG inhibitor and appears at least as potent as ibogaine. The inhibition of the hERG potassium channel delays the repolarization of cardiac action potentials, resulting in QT interval prolongation and, subsequently, in arrhythmias and sudden cardiac arrest.

κ-Opioid receptor
Noribogaine has been determined to act as a biased agonist of the κ-opioid receptor (KOR). It activates the G protein (GDP-GTP exchange) signaling pathway with 75% the efficacy of dynorphin A (EC50 = 9 μM), but it is only 12% as efficacious at activating the β-arrestin pathway. Moreover, due to its very low efficacy on the β-arrestin pathway, noribogaine blocked dynorphin A activation of the pathway (IC50 = 1 μM) and hence functioned as an antagonist of it.

The β-arrestin pathway is thought to be responsible for the dysphoric and aversive effects of KOR activation, and its lack of activation by noribogaine may be the reason for the lack of dysphoric effects of the drug. This biased agonist/antagonist action of noribogaine at the KOR is unique to it relative to other iboga alkaloids and related compounds such as ibogaine and 18-methoxycoronaridine (18-MC). Moreover, it has been hypothesized that it may give noribogaine unique properties such that it may have the analgesic and antiaddictive effects of KOR agonists without the anxiogenic, dysphoric, or anhedonic effects that are typical of them.

See also
 Ibogamine
 Voacangine
 Tabernanthine
 Coronaridine
 RB-64
 6'-Guanidinonaltrindole
 Herkinorin
 TRV130
 Nalfurafine

References

Biased ligands
Iboga
HERG blocker
Delta-opioid receptor antagonists
Kappa-opioid receptor agonists
Kappa-opioid receptor antagonists
Mu-opioid receptor antagonists
NMDA receptor antagonists
Opioids
Phenols
Serotonin reuptake inhibitors